The Superman Monster is a DC Comics Elseworlds comic book, published in 1999. The story combined the elements of the Superman mythos with Mary Shelley's novel Frankenstein where that version of Superman is similar to the Frankenstein Monster. Written by Dan Abnett and Andy Lanning, with art by Anthony Williams and Tom Palmer, The Superman Monster is the sequel to the DC Comics Elseworlds comic book Batman: Two Faces.

Characters
 Superman: The creature created by Luthor from the remains of the deceased. His initial appearance resembled that of Bizarro. He is then re-christened as "Klaus" by the Kant family.
 Vicktor Luthor: A mad genius who is obsessed with conquering death through science.
 Eloise Edge: The daughter of a wealthy burgomeister who is engaged to Luthor. After being accidentally killed by him, Luthor then resurrects her as a monster herself.
 Burgomeister Edge: Eloise's father who does not trust Luthor, and is eventually killed by him.
 Johan and Martha Kant: A simple farming couple who lost their only son and end up adopting the creature as their son.
 James Olafson: Luthor's best friend who is ultimately killed by him.
 Jor-El: An extraterrestrial scientist from the planet Kryton who sent his son from their doomed planet, though he died during the voyage. His advice allowed Luthor to accomplish his goal.

Plot
The story follows on from Batman: Two Faces and unfolds as a tale told to Commissioner Gordon by newspaper magnate Peregrine White in their club, the Iceberg Lounge. 

Five years previously, a ruthless and amoral student called Vicktor Luthor is expelled from the university of Ingolstadt after his experiments in raising the dead offended and outraged his professors. Increasingly obsessed with his research, Luthor schemes to seduce and marry the beautiful Eloise Edge, daughter of the wealthy Burgomeister Edge, only to learn upon their betrothal that Edge has arranged matters so that Luthor will not benefit from his daughter’s wealth. Furious, Luthor storms out of his engagement party only to witness a strange object fall from the sky into a nearby forest. Investigating, Luthor discovers that the object is an advanced spacecraft containing the deceased remains of an infant. A projection of the craft’s designer, an alien scientist called Jor-El, reveals that the craft was intended to carry the infant, Jor-El’s son, to safety following the destruction of their world. 

Luthor realizes that he can use the alien corpse and technology in his experiments, and constructs a “Revival Matrix” which he believes will reanimate the dead, resorting to grave robbery and murder in order to construct a body to revive. He also added a strange crest found in the deceased infants' ship as a conductive breast plate. On activating the Revival Matrix, however, Luthor is horrified when the process goes awry, resulting in a creation of an unnaturally pale, malformed and heavily scarred "superman" with strange abilities beyond those of mortal men. When the creature identifies Luthor as his father, Luthor rejects him in disgust, and the resulting struggle causes a fire in Luthor’s laboratory. The creature uses his abilities, among them flight and super-strength, to rescue Luthor before they were sent back to the ground by a lightning strike. 

When he came to, Luthor went back to Ingolstadt and issued a bounty for the creature he created in order to keep his connection to it a secret. The creature was also present in the village, where he is overwhelmed by the noise and activity his heightened senses can pick up. Out of instinct, the creature intervenes to rescue the occupant of an out-of-control carriage, who turns out to be Eloise. While she treats him with kindness and gratitude, the other townsfolk attack him out of fear, causing the creature to flee. He eventually makes his way to an isolated farm owned by Johan and Martha Kant, who recently lost their son. After the creature saved Johan from a vicious bear, he and Martha take the creature in, naming him "Klaus" after their deceased son. Klaus uses his powers to help on their farm, begins to learn the ways of humanity, and his monstrous appearance gradually becomes more human. 

While grateful to the Kants, Klaus admits that he wishes to resolve matters with his creator, unaware that Luthor has learned of his presence at the farm and has hired a local mob to attack the farm, setting the cottage on fire. Johan attempts to defend his family but suffers a fatal heart attack. Enraged by this, Klaus attacks Luthor, only to be overwhelmed by a green stone recovered from the spacecraft that Luthor had fashioned into a cane. Klaus then returns to the burning cottage to rescue Martha, and Luthor assumes they both perished in the blaze. He then returns to Ingolstadt to marry Eloise with his friend, James Olafson as his best man, but Klaus appears and crashes the wedding to get his revenge. Luthor produces a gun and tries to shoot Klaus, only for the bullets to bounce off his impenetrable skin and strike Eloise, killing her, and then uses his cane to subdue the enraged Klaus.

After all the guests leave the tragic scene, James stays behind to look after his friend. As he looks for Luthor, he then learns that Burgomeister Edge had been murdered in his sleep via asphyxiation, and then finds Luthor attempting to revive Eloise with his Revival Matrix. Not wanting interference, Luthor shoots James and dumps him downstairs, where he finds a weakened Klaus with a necklace of green stones. Luthor manages to revive Eloise, but she is overwhelmed by what has happened to her and rejects him. Klaus, arriving too late to intervene, comforts Eloise and offers to help her adjust to her new life. When Luthor tries to stop them, he is battered away, causing a fire which destroys the Revival Matrix. Immune to the flames, Klaus and Eloise embrace and fly away.

At this point Commissioner Gordon skeptically interrupts White's story, demanding to know how he knows what happened. White reveals that, while on a ship travelling to Archangel that had become trapped in ice, he and the crew had encountered Luthor, driven mad by his experiences and desperately searching for a "fortress of solitude" where he believed Klaus and Eloise had eloped. White was able to piece together what had happened from Luthor’s ramblings and journals, but Luthor quickly died from hypothermia. Upon which, Klaus appears in the sky, now completely healed and glowing angelically. After using heat produced from his eyes to free the ship from the ice, Klaus takes Luthor's body and flies for home. After concluding his tale, White and Gordon part ways from the Lounge.

Publication
 The Superman Monster (paperback, 52 pages, October 1999)

See also
Batman: Castle of the Bat
Batman: Two Faces
Frankenstein in popular culture
List of Elseworlds publications

References

Superman Monster at Grand Comics Database
Superman Monster at Comic Book Database

External links
Superman Monster at comicvine.com

1999 comics debuts
Comics by Andy Lanning
Comics by Dan Abnett
Superman titles
Elseworlds titles
DC Comics one-shots
Works based on Frankenstein
Crossover comics
Fiction set in 1883
Fiction set in 1888